Wschowa (pronounced) is a town in the Lubusz Voivodeship in western Poland with 13,875 inhabitants (2019). It is the capital of Wschowa County and a significant tourist site containing many important historical monuments.

History

Wschowa was originally a border fortress in a region disputed by the Polish dukes of Silesia and Greater Poland. After German colonists had established a settlement nearby, it received Magdeburg rights around 1250. The Old Polish name Veschow was first mentioned in 1248, while the Middle High German name Frowenstat Civitas first appeared in 1290. Despite forming part of Poland over centuries, the town was shaped by its German-speaking populace until 1945.

After the Silesian Piast dukes had gradually accepted Bohemian suzerainty, King Casimir III the Great in 1343 finally conquered it for Poland. The ziemia Wschowa then was incorporated into the Greater Polish Poznań Voivodeship of the Polish Crown. Since then Fraustadt/Wschowa was a royal town of Poland and the seat of local starosts.

Fraustadt/Wschowa and its Latin school was one of the centres of the Protestant Reformation in Poland and a retreat for religious refugees in the days of the Counter-Reformation in adjacent Habsburg Silesia. In the 17th century, Italian Niccolo Bacaralli established in Fraustadt the first paint manufacture in Poland.

In the 18th century kings Augustus II the Strong and Augustus III of Poland often resided in Fraustadt/Wschowa and the town was even called the "unofficial capital of Poland". The Royal Castle hosted meetings of Polish kings with foreign delegations and even sessions of the Senate of the Polish–Lithuanian Commonwealth were held in Fraustadt/Wschowa. In 1737 a concordat between the Holy See and Poland was signed in Fraustadt/Wschowa.

The Battle of Fraustadt occurred on February 3, 1706, during the Great Northern War, when Swedish forces defeated a joint army of the Polish–Lithuanian Commonwealth, Saxony and Russia. Within the Second Partition of Poland in 1793, the region was annexed by the Kingdom of Prussia and incorporated into the province of South Prussia, until in 1807 it was awarded to the Duchy of Warsaw according to the Treaty of Tilsit.

Jakob Walter, a Napoleonic soldier claimed to have passed through the town in 1806. He claims the town was used as a garrison and had 99 windmills.

A part of the Grand Duchy of Posen from 1815 on, the town was again incorporated into the Prussian Province of Posen in 1848. In 1890, the town had a population of 6,873, of which 500 (7.3%) were Poles. According to the 1919 Treaty of Versailles, Fraustadt remained a part of Germany as it had a majority of German citizens and formed the southernmost district of the Posen-West Prussia border province till 1 October 1938, when the province was dissolved. It became a district center in the Province of Silesia till 1941, from 1941 to 1945 in the Province of Lower Silesia.

Fraustadt was one of the few areas within Germany attacked by the Polish military during the Polish Defensive War in 1939. For a few hours its neighboring village of Geyersdorf (now Dębowa Łęka) was the first German town to be occupied by enemy forces in the war. The other notable attack was carried on the same day by one PZL.23B of the 21st Squadron; the factory in Oława (then Ohlau) was the first victim of a bomb attack onto the German territory. Fraustadt was occupied by the Red Army in February 1945.

After the capitulation of Germany, all remaining inhabitants were expelled westward, ethnically cleansing the town. Initially the town was part of Okręg III (comprising present West Pomeranian and Lubusz provinces) between 1945 and 1946. German monuments were removed from the town by the new authorities, including the Protestant cemetery. Also, in 1968, the remains of the former German-Jewish cemetery were destroyed.

Later, Wschowa was a county (powiat) center in Poznan Voivodeship between 1946 and 1950, then in Zielona Gora Voivodeship between 1950 and 1975. It was finally a commune (gmina) center in Leszno Voivodeship between 1975 and 1999 before the creation of Lubusz province. It became again a county center after 24 years.

Sports
Wschowa hosted the 2010 edition of the Polish Sidecarcross Grand Prix.

Notable people
 Valerius Herberger (1562–1627), German Lutheran theologian
 Melchior Teschner (1584–1635), German cantor, composer and theologian
 Andreas Gryphius (1616–1664), German Baroque poet, lived at Fraustadt on and off
 Franciszek Antoni Kwilecki (1725–1794), Polish official, starost of Wschowa, deputy to the Great Sejm, which he opened, supporter and signatory of the Constitution of 3 May 1791
  (1787–1869), Polish officer, November Uprising participant
 Rudolf Ewald Stier (1800–1862), German Protestant theologian 
 Florian Stablewski (1841–1906), archbishop, Primate of Poland
 Leo Rosenberg (1879–1963), German jurist
 Fritz Thurm (1883–1937), German resistance fighter
 Alfred Fellisch (1884–1973), German politician
 Bronisław Geremek (1932–2008), historian and politician, attended school at Wschowa
 Waldy Dzikowski (born 1959), politician, born in Wschowa
 Grzegorz Król (born 1978), footballer
 Marcin Warcholak (born 1989), footballer 
 Weronika Wróblewska (born 2007), footballer

Twin towns – sister cities
See twin towns of Gmina Wschowa.

References

External links

Official town website
Jewish Community in Wschowa on Virtual Shtetl

Cities and towns in Lubusz Voivodeship
Wschowa County